Oborski, feminine Oborska is a Polish noble family name. Historically it originated from the nobiliary toponymic naming "z Obór" ("from Obory"). The suffix "-ski" in Polish surnames has the same function.

Notable people with the surname include:
 (died 1697) a statesmnan of the Polish Lithuanian Commonwealth
Mikołaj Stanisław Oborski (1576–1646), Polish jesuit and writer
Ryszard Oborski (born 1952), Polish sprint canoer
Tomasz Oborski (1571–1645) was the auxiliary bishop of Kraków from 1614 to 1645

References

Polish-language surnames